County Route 533 (CR 533) is a county highway in the U.S. state of New Jersey. The highway extends  from the White Horse Circle, in Hamilton Township to Middlesex CR 607 on the border of Bound Brook and Middlesex Borough. CR 533 shares a long concurrency with U.S. Route 206 (US 206) through Princeton and Montgomery Township, while portions of the roadway in Somerset County are part of the Millstone River Valley Scenic Byway.

It also has a key historic importance, as George Washington used the road during his march from Trenton to Princeton during the American Revolution. This is commemorated by several small stone pillars at various points along the road.

Route description

White Horse to Princeton

The southern third of CR 533 serves as a shorter, more direct route between two parts of US 206, connecting the southern portion as it travels north from Bordentown and the northern portion as moves through Princeton and into Somerset County. The U.S. highway turns west down Broad Street at the circle and winds confusingly through the city of Trenton before moving through Lawrence, the county route continues nearly due north through Hamilton and along the Lawrence/West Windsor boundary into Princeton. CR 524 also begins at the circle, following Broad in the other direction toward Yardville and Allentown.

For its first  in southern Hamilton, the route is White Horse-Mercerville Road, as it connects the two census-designated places of White Horse and Mercerville. Along the way, it accesses both Interstates 295 (exit 61) and 195 (exit 2) via Arena Drive, just  from the southern terminus. In Mercerville, it intersects Route 33, providing access to downtown Trenton and the business-laden stretch of Hamilton Square. Less than  later, CR 533 meets CR 535 and Nottingham Way at a five-point intersection, and continues north as Quaker Bridge Road.

At this point, the route picks up the trail followed by Washington. It passes Sloan Avenue, which again provides access to I-295 at exit 65 and widens to four lanes wide. From here, it continues on to the northern border of Hamilton and follows the border between Lawrence to the west and West Windsor on the east (the Keith line). It crosses Amtrak's Northeast Corridor and passes the Quaker Bridge Mall complex to the left as it approaches US 1.

After the US 1 cloverleaf interchange, the road name briefly changes to Province Line Road and intersects an access road to Mercer Mall. At the next traffic light, it intersects the access to the Nassau Park shopping center and Province Line Road, unsigned CR 569. North of this intersection, CR 533 becomes unsigned and is known as Quaker Road. After crossing the Delaware and Raritan Canal at Port Mercer, Quaker Road becomes under the jurisdiction of Princeton, turns off the Keith line into the borough, and crosses Stony Brook on Quaker Bridge. Paralleling Stony Brook and adjacent to farmland, CR 533 intersects Princeton Pike, also known as CR 583, before winding its way through a small residential area, narrows such that it becomes traversable for northbound traffic only, and reaches its intersection with US 206.

Concurrency with Route 206
During its  concurrency with Route 206, CR 533 passes Drumthwacket, Nassau Street (Route 27's southern terminus) in downtown Princeton and Princeton Airport near an intersection with Route 518 in Montgomery Township, just beyond the county line between Mercer and Somerset. Just before the end of the concurrency, the road passes over Beden Brook. CR 533 is not signed anywhere along its concurrency with US 206.

Montgomery to Bound Brook

CR 533 finally splits off of US 206 in northern Montgomery, breaking off to the right and running along the western bank of the Millstone River, which is itself parallel to the Delaware and Raritan Canal for this stretch. It is now known as River Road, and there is a Canal Road that also mirrors CR 533 on the far side of the two waterways in Franklin Township.

CR 533 meets Township Line Road from the left, marking the move from Montgomery into Hillsborough. Here, it intersects Amwell Road (CR 514), which provides access to a short bypass of the borough to the west. Upon reentering Hillsborough Township, CR 533 meets the northern terminus of the aforementioned bypass, signed as CR 533 Bypass.

CR 533 passes by the Central Jersey Regional Airport, then turns away from the river as it becomes Main Street in the borough of Manville. After , CR 533 crosses the Raritan River over Van Veghten's Bridge and enters Bridgewater. CR 533 reaches CDP Of Finderne, and turns right down Main Street, traveling almost due east for its remaining . In its busy final mile, it passes by TD Bank Ballpark, the Bridgewater Train Station and Interstate 287, enters Bound Brook. There is no direct access to I-287, but Promenade Boulevard does carry traffic to Route 28 at exit 13 off the freeway. Traveling through Bound Brook, reaches an intersection with Route 527 (Mountain Avenue) and forms a concurrency through the downtown area. After a roundabout, CR 527 heads to the south while CR 533 continues east along East Main Street. On a bridge connecting Bound Brook and the Middlesex County borough of Middlesex, CR 533 ends while Middlesex CR 607 continues east as Lincoln Boulevard.

Major intersections

CR 533 Spur

County Route 533 Spur (signed as County Route 533 Bypass) is a county highway in the U.S. state of New Jersey. The highway extends  from Millstone Bypass (CR 514) in Millstone to Millstone River Road (CR 533) in Hillsborough Township. It is known as Somerset Courthouse Road. There is only one other intersection along the road besides its two endpoints, Hamilton Road just feet north of the Millstone–Hillsborough Township border.

See also

References

External links

 New Jersey 5xx Routes (Dan Moraseski)

533
533
533